The wildlife of Somaliland includes the flora and fauna of Somaliland, which is extremely diverse due to the country's location between the temperate and the tropical zones. Somaliland is bordered by the Red Sea. The Coastal region is more humid due to its proximity to the ocean. Somaliland is home to over 727 bird species and boasts over 177 species of mammals.

Somaliland is home to a diverse variety of flora and fauna, from acacia trees, to birds, large cats, and reptiles large and small.

In some areas, the mountains are covered with shrubs such as pyracantha, jasmine, poinsettia, and a varied assortment of evergreens. Caraway, carcade, cardamom, coriander, incense, myrrh, and red pepper are common.

Lexicology
There are many forms of terminology and ways of describing the subphylums, metonyms and classifications of the various animals living within Somaliland.

Fauna

Mammals

Somaliland contains a variety of mammals due to its geographical and climatic diversity. Wild animals are found in every region. Among the latter are the lion, Sudan cheetah, reticulated giraffe, hamadryas baboon, civet, serval, African bush elephant, bushpig, Soemmerring's gazelle, antelope, ibex, kudu, dik-dik, oribi, reedbuck, Somali wild ass, Grévy's zebra, hyena.

Elephants are also found here. Since elephants are migratory, they are found in a variety of habitats, such as woodland, savanna, and tropical forest. Somaliland is home to a diverse variety of flora and fauna , from acacia trees, to birds, primates, large cats, and reptiles large and small. The yellow-spotted rock hyrax, which is found in savanna and rocky areas, looks much like a large rodent, but is actually related to elephants. The savanna-dwelling golden mole, and the shrub-land and desert-dwelling.

The following species of mammals are found exclusively in Somaliland:
Pygmy gerbil
Elephant shrew
Berbera gerbil
Crocidura greenwoodi
Gerbillus brockmani

Birds

Somaliland is currently home to about 727 bird species, of which eight are endemic, one has been introduced by humans and one is rare or accidental. Fourteen species are globally threatened.
The following species of birds are found exclusively in Somaliland:
Red-eyed dove (Streptopelia semitorquata)
Speckled pigeon (Columba guinea guinea)
White-backed vulture (Gyps africanus)
Namaqua dove (Oena capensis capensis)
Somali Bulbul (Pycnonotus barbatus somaliensis)
Somali Pigeon (Columba oliviae) 
Black boubou (Laniarius nigerrimus)
Lesser hoopoe-lark (Alaemon hamertoni, Alaudidae)
Archer's lark (Heteromirafra archeri, Alaudidae)
Ash's bushlark (Mirafra ashi)
Somali bushlark (Mirafra somalica, Alaudidae)
Warsangli linnet (Linaria johannis, Fringillidae)

Reptiles
Somaliland has roughly 235 species of reptiles.

There is reptiles unique to Somaliland include Hughes' saw-scaled viper, Boomslang, Black Mamba, Yellow-bellied sea snake, Egyptian Cobra, Red Spitting Cobra, Somali puff adder, Somali carpet viper, Platyceps messanai, Scortecci's diadem snake Spalerosophis josephscorteccii, the Somali sand boa, the angled worm lizard, Macfadyen's mastigure Uromastyx macfadyeni, Lanza's gecko Hemidactylus granchii, the semaphore gecko, and a wall lizard from either Mesalina or Eremias. The colubrid snake Aprosdoketophis andreonei and Haacke-Greer's skink Haackgreerius miopus are endemic genera.

Fish

With 740 km of coastline facing the Red Sea, Somaliland waters are prime fishing grounds for highly migratory fish species such as tuna and tuna-like species, and a narrow but productive continental shelf is the home to several demersal fish and crustacean species.

Fish species found exclusively in Somaliland include:
Cirrhitichthys randalli
Symphurus fuscus
Parapercis simulata
Cociella somaliensis
Pseudochromis melanotus

Flora
The highlands, which in an almost continuous line traverse East Africa, have to a great extent isolated the flora of Somaliland in spite of the general resemblance of its climate and soil to the country on the western side of the band of high ground. The greater part of the country is covered either with tall coarse grasses, or more commonly with thick thorn-bush or jungle, among which rise occasional isolated, trees. The prevalent bush plants are khansa, acacias, aloes, and, especially Boswellia and Commiphora, which yield highly fragrant resins and balsams, such as myrrh, frankincense (olibanum) and balm of Gilead.

Of herbaceous plants, the kissenia, the sole representative of the order Loasaceae, which is common in America but very rare elsewhere, is found in Somaliland, which also possesses forms belonging to the eastern Mediterranean flora.

The following vascular plant genera are found exclusively in Somaliland:
Boswellia occulta (Burseraceae) The new species Boswellia occulta is described from a small area in the El Afweyn District of Somaliland, where it is locally of considerable socio-economic importance. Although used for frankincense production by many generations of local harvesters, it has been unknown to science until now.
Iphiona rotundifolia
Euphorbia inculta
Odontanthera radians, a member of the family Apocynaceae, which is found in the coastal and subcoastal areas of Somaliland.
Balanites rotundifolia
Boscia miminifolia
Vachellia tortilis
Eriostylos 1 spp. Amaranthaceae
Polyrhabda 1 spp. Amaranthaceae
Goydera 1 spp. Apocynaceae
Whitesloanea 1 spp. Apocynaceae
Puccionia 1 spp. Cleomaceae
Afrotrichloris 2 spp. Gramineae
Pseudozoysia 1 spp. Gramineae
Taeniorhachis 1 spp. Gramineae
Renschia 1 spp. Labiatae
Symphyochlamys 1 spp. Malvaceae

National animals

 National animal: Kudu

Notes

References

Biota of Somaliland
Somaliland